The Sacramento Suns is a United States Australian Football League team, based in Sacramento, United States. It was founded in 2009. They play in the USAFL.

External links
 

Australian rules football clubs in the United States
Australian rules football clubs established in 2009
2009 establishments in California
Sports teams in Sacramento, California